Kelishad (also Romanized as Kelīshād) is a village in Emamzadeh Abdol Aziz Rural District, Jolgeh District, Isfahan County, Isfahan Province, Iran. At the 2006 census, its population was 322, in 86 families.

References 

Populated places in Isfahan County